Rubidium azide is an inorganic compound with the formula . It is the rubidium salt of the hydrazoic acid . Like most azides, it is explosive.

Preparation 
Rubidium azide can be created by the reaction between rubidium sulfate and barium azide which results in formation of easily separated insoluble barium sulfate:

In at least one study, rubidium azide was produced by the reaction between butyl nitrite, hydrazine monohydrate, and rubidium hydroxide in the presence of ethanol:

This formula is typically used to synthesize potassium azide from caustic potash.

Uses 
Rubidium azide has been investigated for possible use in alkali vapor cells, which are components of atomic clocks, atomic magnetometers and atomic gyroscopes. Azides are desirable starting materials because they decompose into rubidium metal and nitrogen gas when exposed to UV light. According to one publication:Among the different techniques used to fill microfabricated alkali vapor cell , UV decomposition of rubidium azide into metallic Rb and nitrogen in  coated cells is a very promising approach for low-cost wafer-level fabrication.

Structure 
At room temperature, rubidium azide has the same structure as potassium hydrogen fluoride; a distorted cesium chloride structure. At 315 °C and 1 atm, rubidium azide will transition to the normal cesium chloride structure. The II/I transition temperature of rubidium azide is within 2 °C of its melting point.

Reactions 
As with all azides, it will decompose and release nitrogen gas when heated or severely shocked:

Discharge rubidium azide in nitrogen gas will produce rubidium nitride.

Hazards 
At 4.1 kilobars of pressure and about 460 °C, rubidium azide will explosively decompose. Under normal circumstances, it explodes at 395 °C. It also decomposes upon exposure to ultraviolet light.

Rubidium azide is very sensitive to mechanical shock, with an impact sensitivity comparable to that of TNT.

Like all azides, rubidium azide is toxic.

References 

Azides
Rubidium compounds
Explosive chemicals